Yongning is a town on the southern coast of Fujian province of Southeast China. It is surrounded on three sides by water, facing the Taiwan Strait to the east, Mount Baoshan to the west, and the town of Shenhu and Shenhu Bay to the south. , there are 4 residential communities and 20 villages under the town's administration.

References

永宁镇. Retrieved 2011-05-05

Township-level divisions of Fujian
Shishi, Fujian